Nyaunggon is the name of several villages in Burma:

 Nyaunggon, Bhamo
 Nyaunggon, Homalin
Nyaunggon, Mingin